Salerano may refer to:

 Salerano Canavese, municipality in the Metropolitan City of Turin in the region Piedmont, Italy.
 Salerano sul Lambro, municipality in the Province of Lodi in the region Lombardy, Italy.